Kayakent (Qayagent) is a rural locality (a selo) and the administrative centre of Kayakentsky Selsoviet, Kayakentsky District, Republic of Dagestan, Russia. The population was 11,144 as of 2010. There are 90 streets.

Geography 
Kayakent is located 10 km west of Novokayakent (the district's administrative centre) by road, on the left bank of the Gamriozen River. Usemikent and Shalasi are the nearest rural localities.

Nationalities 
Kumyks live there.

References 

Rural localities in Kayakentsky District